The A449 is a major road in the United Kingdom. It runs north from junction 24 of the M4 motorway at Newport in South Wales to Stafford in Staffordshire.

The southern section of the road, between Ross on Wye and Newport forms part of the trunk route from the English Midlands to South Wales, avoiding the Severn Bridge

Route

Newport – Ross-on-Wye

The A449 starts on the M4 at the Coldra Interchange (J24) in Newport and is dual carriageway all the way to Raglan. The section from the A40 junction at Raglan to the A472 junction at Usk, known as the New Midlands Road, was one of the first sections to be dualled, opening on 16 October 1970. A special postmark dated 8 December 1972 was produced showing the opening of the A449 by The Secretary of State for Wales. Between Raglan and Ross-on-Wye the A449 is concurrent with the A40.

Ross-on-Wye – Worcester
The road becomes quite twisty on departing Ross-on-Wye, but straightens out a little before arriving at Ledbury. The road turns northwards upon crossing into Worcestershire at Little Malvern and skirts the eastern slopes of the Malvern Hills through the town of Great Malvern. It then crosses Worcester's ring road, the A4440, at a roundabout near Powick.

Worcester – Wolverhampton

North of Worcester, a spur road of the same number heads towards the M5 Junction 6, while the main route continues towards Kidderminster, concurrent with the A442. Between Claines and Hartlebury the A449 is once again dual carriageway, but much tinkering has left the road with a single lane each way and  speed restriction. The road becomes urban again while passing through Kidderminster. It then heads north into Staffordshire, passing between Kinver and Stourbridge and crossing the A458 at Stourton. The A491 meets it just north of Kingswinford. Continuing northwards, it passes Wombourne (becoming dual carriageway once more) being joined by the A463 before turning sharply north-east into the outskirts of Wolverhampton and meeting the Ring Road.

Wolverhampton – Stafford

The road resumes its journey northwards, passing Molineux Stadium (home of Wolverhampton Wanderers F.C.) and leaving the city just south of Junction 2 of the M54. It originally ran through the centre of Wolverhampton until the 1980s, when all roads within the new ring road were declassified. Around the same time, the section of Waterloo Road on which Molineux Stadium stands was declassified and the A459 Stafford Street (north of the Ring Road) and Lower Stafford Street became part of the A449.

From there it forms part of the link between the M54 and the M6 North. It crosses the A5 at the Gailey Roundabout near the village of Gailey, a short distance west of M6 Junction 12, at which point it reverts to a single carriageway. It passes through Penkridge before crossing the M6 at Junction 13, reaching its terminus at its junction with the A34 in Stafford.

Originally turnpiked under an Act of 1760, the Wolverhampton-Stafford road was part of the historic London-Liverpool coach route. Notoriously narrow in the 19th century, much of it was turned into dual carriageway between the world wars. The Gailey Roundabout was improved in 1929 and again in 1937, removing parts of the churchyard and the historic Spread Eagle Inn (although the latter was replaced by a new building). Widening at Penkridge between 1932 and 1934 reshaped the western part of the town, resulting in the demolition of many ancient buildings. The dual carriageway between Wolverhampton and Gailey was constructed between 1936 and 1939. This section of the road was featured in Citizen Khan episode "Alia's University".

Former Routes 
 The original routing of the road was from Bromsgrove – Stourbridge – Wolverhampton – Stafford
 The villages of Hartlebury and Ombersley have been bypassed
 Part of Ledbury is now bypassed
 Between Raglan and Newport the A449 used to run through the towns of Usk and Caerleon, along a now mostly unclassified road to the west, terminating at junction 25 of the M4

Water Crossings 
 River Trothy, Monmouth
 River Monnow, Monmouth
 River Wye, Ross-on-Wye
 River Leadon, Ledbury
 River Severn, Worcester
 Stourbridge Canal, Stourton
 River Stour, Kinver
 Wom Brook, Wombourne
 Birmingham Canal, Wolverhampton
 Staffordshire and Worcestershire Canal, Coven
 River Penk, Penkridge

See also
Trunk roads in Wales

References

External links 

Road to Nowhere: A449

Roads in England
Roads in Wales
Transport in Herefordshire
Transport in Monmouthshire
Transport in Newport, Wales
Transport in Staffordshire
Roads in Worcestershire
Transport in Worcester, England
Malvern, Worcestershire
Transport in Wolverhampton